It Don't Cost Nothin' to Say Good Morning is a 1994 documentary film directed by Kenny Hotz and Spencer Rice. The film is about the life of a homeless man, known only as "'Shorty' Gordy", who was a beloved but drunken, potty-mouthed panhandler, which was filmed over three years, covering Gordy's life and death. The movie premiered at Palm Springs Film Festival, Cinéfest, the Worldwide Short Film Festival and won best short at the Hot Docs Film Festival.

External links
 
 Official website of show creator Kenny Hotz
It Don't Cost Nothin' to Say Good Morning on Kenny Hotz's Official channel

1994 films
Canadian documentary films
Documentary films about homelessness in Canada
1994 documentary films
1990s Canadian films